Deep in the Hole may refer to:

 "Deep in the Hole" (song), a 1983 song by AC/DC
 Deep in the Hole (album), a 2001 album by Masters of Reality\